In the United States, the term constitutional carry, also called permitless carry, unrestricted carry, or Vermont carry, refers to the legal public carrying of a handgun, either openly or concealed, without a license or permit. The phrase does not typically refer to the unrestricted carrying of a long gun, a knife, or other weapons. The scope and applicability of constitutional carry may vary by state.

The phrase "constitutional carry" reflects the view that the Second Amendment to the U.S. Constitution does not abide restrictions on gun rights, including the right to carry or bear arms.

The U.S. Supreme Court had never extensively interpreted the Second Amendment until the landmark case District of Columbia v. Heller in 2008. Prior to this, a tapestry of different and sometimes conflicting laws about carrying firearms developed across the nation. In deciding the case, the Court found that self-defense was a "...central component of the 2nd Amendment" and D.C.'s handgun ban was invalidated. The Court further stated that some state or local gun controls are allowed. The Heller case was extended by the Supreme Court in the 2010 decision McDonald v. Chicago, which held that the 2nd and 14th Amendments to the U.S. Constitution were "fully incorporated" and thus the right to "...keep and bear arms applies to the states and not 'in a watered-down version' but 'fully applicable'...", and limits state and local governments in enacting laws that restrict this individual and fundamental right to "...keep and bear arms", for self-defense.  In the 2022 decision New York State Rifle & Pistol Association, Inc. v. Bruen the Supreme Court went further, affirming a right to public carry of firearms and imposing a strict new standard of scrutiny on state-level firearms laws.

U.S. jurisdictions that have constitutional carry

, Alabama, Alaska, Arizona, Arkansas, Georgia, Idaho, Indiana, Iowa, Kansas, Kentucky, Maine, Mississippi, Missouri, Montana, New Hampshire, North Dakota (residents only; concealed carry only), Ohio, Oklahoma, South Dakota, Tennessee (handguns only), Texas, Utah, Vermont, West Virginia, and Wyoming generally allow most law-abiding adults to carry a loaded concealed firearm without a permit. Certain states may impose additional restrictions on the legal ability to carry without a permit beyond those who are not prohibited from owning a firearm. Permitless carry in North Dakota is applicable to residents only; nonresidents must have a permit to carry a handgun concealed or openly. Permitless concealed carry in Mississippi only covers certain manners of carrying. Permitless carry in Oklahoma applies to both residents and nonresidents 21+ as well as 18+ nonresidents who can carry without a permit in their home state. All aforementioned jurisdictions do not require a permit to openly carry either except for North Dakota and certain localities in Missouri.

On July 26, 2014, Washington, D.C. became a permitless carry jurisdiction for a few days when its ban on carrying a handgun was ruled unconstitutional, and the ruling was not stayed. The ruling stated that any resident who had a legally registered handgun could carry it without a permit, and nonresidents without felony convictions could carry as well. The ruling was then stayed on July 29, 2014.

In June 2015, following victory in a class-action suit brought by "Damas de la Segunda Enmienda" Ladies of the Second Amendment (an affiliate of the Second Amendment Foundation) the Commonwealth of Puerto Rico's carry and licensing regulations were struck down, eliminating the requirement to obtain a permit. On October 31, 2016, The Supreme Court of Puerto Rico denied a motion for reconsideration of a previous Court of Appeals decision that had found the Weapons Act to be constitutional.

Vermont does not have any provision for issue of concealed-carry licenses, as none has ever been necessary. As such, Vermont residents wishing to carry handguns in other states must acquire a license from a state which is valid in their destination. All other constitutional carry states previously had concealed-carry license requirements prior to adoption of unrestricted carry laws, and continue to issue licenses on a shall-issue basis for the purposes of inter-state reciprocity (allowing residents of the state to travel to other states with a concealed weapon, abiding by that state's law).

Alabama

On March 10, 2022, Alabama Governor Kay Ivey signed House Bill 272 (effective January 1, 2023) into law which eliminates the requirement to obtain a permit in order to carry a concealed pistol in the state, as well as carrying a loaded pistol openly or concealed in a vehicle. Open carry without a permit was already legal for residents and non-residents 18+.

Alaska
On June 11, 2003, Alaska governor Frank Murkowski signed House Bill 102 into law (effective September 9, 2003), making Alaska the first state to rescind its requirement for a concealed carry permit. The bill eliminated the crime of simply carrying a concealed weapon by changing the definition of the crime. The section of law that describes the first instance of "misconduct involving weapons in the 5th degree" now requires that a person must either fail to inform a law enforcement officer of the weapon upon contact, fail to allow the law enforcement officer to secure the weapon (or to properly secure the weapon him/herself) upon contact, or if at another person's home, fail to obtain permission from a resident to have a concealed weapon on the premises. No permit is required to open carry or conceal carry for both residents and nonresidents. Open carry is 16+ and concealed carry is 21+.

Arizona
On April 16, 2010, Arizona governor Jan Brewer signed Senate Bill 1108 into law (effective July 29, 2010). The law eliminated the requirement to obtain a permit to carry a concealed weapon in Arizona for U.S. citizens or U.S residents 21 and older. The process to obtain a permit was left in place so that Arizona residents could still obtain permits in order to carry concealed in other states or to carry in a restaurant or bar that serves alcohol. This extends to both Arizona residents and nonresidents with no permit required to open carry at 18 and none required to concealed carry 21 and up.

Arkansas
Prior to August 16, 2013, Arkansas law (§ 5-73-120) prohibited "...carrying a weapon...with a purpose to employ the handgun, knife, or club as a weapon against a person." Among other exceptions, Arkansas law allowed a defense to the charge of carrying of a weapon if "[t]he person is on a journey..." but did not define what constituted a "journey". Another defense permitted an individual to carry a concealed weapon if the person had a valid concealed weapons license. This provision was generally interpreted to prohibit open carry.

On August 16, 2013, Arkansas enacted Act 746. This act made two major changes. First, it statutorily defined a "journey" as "...travel beyond the county in which a person lives..." Because traveling on a journey is one of the defenses to § 5-73-120, a plain reading of the statute would indicate that the prohibition against carrying a weapon would now apply only to a person traveling within their home county. Second, it modified § 5-73-120 to prohibit "...carrying a weapon...with a purpose to attempt to unlawfully employ the handgun, knife, or club as a weapon against a person." Various firearms groups interpreted this provision to require that the state must now prove that a person actually intends to use a weapon to commit a crime; and without proving this intent, possession of weapons, whether openly or concealed, is now legal.

However, some confusion still existed. On July 8, 2013, Arkansas Attorney General Dustin McDaniel issued an opinion stating that Act 746 did not authorize open carry. On August 18, 2015, Arkansas Attorney General Leslie Rutledge issued a different opinion, saying that open carry of a weapon following Act 746's passage is now generally legal, provided that the person has no intent to unlawfully employ said weapon. Rutledge also opined that, while mere possession of a loaded handgun was formerly sufficient to establish "intent to employ" it as a weapon, such possession is now no longer sufficient to convict someone under § 5-73-120. Rather, the state must now additionally prove intent to unlawfully use the weapon. However, Rutledge also opined that concealed carry generally remains illegal without a permit. Because Act 746 did not remove or modify the other sections of Arkansas law pertaining to issuing concealed weapons permits, she concluded that possession of a concealed weapon without a permit could be construed as meeting the "unlawful purpose" requirement. However, various firearms groups disputed this opinion and argued that, because § 5-73-120 (and specifically subsection (a)) permits unlicensed open carry, the same legal logic would dictate that concealed carry without a permit would also be legal. Further adding to the confusion was the fact that Act 746 changed the list of § 5-73-120 exceptions, including possession while on a journey and possession of a concealed handgun with a concealed handgun permit, from a list of "affirmative defenses" to a list of "permissible circumstances". Rutledge noted in her opinion that such change could be construed as creating a "non-exhaustive list of circumstances under which it is permissible to carry a handgun," thereby permitting a person to assert additional circumstances not spelled out in the statute. She also noted that future legislation would be the best solution to clear up the confusion that Act 746 has caused.

On October 17, 2018, the Arkansas Court of Appeals issued a ruling that clarified that the mere carrying of a handgun is not a crime by itself absent a purpose to attempt to unlawfully employ the handgun as a weapon against a person, and any ambiguity would be found in favor of the defendant per the rule of lenity. This effectively ends the dispute on the legality of permitless carry in Arkansas and allows for the unlicensed open carry and concealed carry of a weapon for both residents and non-residents.

Georgia 
On April 12, 2022, Georgia Governor Brian Kemp signed SB319 into law which took effect immediately. While Georgia was the 25th state to pass a constitutional carry bill, Georgia is the 22nd state for constitutional permitless carry legislation to take effect. This law allows both residents and non-residents 21 years of age and older to carry handguns, long guns, and other weapons including knives, openly or concealed, in public, without a permit. The legislation also removed the residency requirement for out-of-state permit holders, allowing for both residents and non-residents alike to carry between the ages of 18-20 with any out-of-state carry permit.

Idaho 
As of July 1, 2020, HB 516 extended the law to be applicable to all U.S. citizens and active military members. Prior permitless carry (SB 1389) was limited to Idaho residents and active military members from July 1, 2016, to July 1, 2020. The minimum age was lowered from 21 to 18 on July 1, 2019, while within city limits (minimum age was already 18 outside city limits) and allows for any weapon, not just handguns. Before July 1, 2016, permitless concealed carry was allowed only outside city limits with only permitless open carry being legal statewide. Now both open and concealed carry without a permit is allowed for residents and nonresidents 18+ statewide.

Indiana 
On March 21, 2022, Indiana Governor Eric Holcomb signed HEA 1296 into law (effective July 1, 2022), making Indiana the 24th state to institute constitutional carry. HEA 1296 legalizes both open and concealed carry without a permit for residents and non-residents 18+.

Iowa 
On November 8, 2022, Iowa adopted Constitutional Amendment 1, The Right to Keep and Bear Arms, including the requirement of "strict scrutiny for any alleged violations of the right brought before a court". The margin was 65.2% "Yes" to 34.8% "No".

On March 17, 2021, the Iowa House of Representatives passed HF 756, 60–37. The Iowa Senate passed the bill on March 22, 2021, 31–17. Among other provisions, it removes the requirement for a permit to carry a firearm concealed or to carry a firearm openly within city limits, as previously one was allowed to carry openly without a permit outside of city limits. This extends both permitless open and concealed carry statewide for residents and non-residents. Governor Kim Reynolds signed the bill on April 2, 2021, and it took effect on July 1, 2021.

Kansas
SB45 was introduced in the Kansas Senate in early 2015. The bill initially passed the Senate 31–7 on February 26. The bill was sent to the House, amended, and passed 85–39 on March 25. The Senate then concurred, passing the amended bill 31-8 (also on March 25). On April 2, the bill was signed by Governor Sam Brownback (effective July 1, 2015), establishing constitutional carry in Kansas. Can carry concealed at 21 years old or older and open carry at 18 years or older without a permit for both residents and nonresidents. Non-residents 18 to 20 may carry concealed but are still required to hold a valid concealed carry permit.

Kansas issues licenses to carry concealed handguns on a shall-issue basis. , over 87,000 current permits are issued. Kansas will continue to issue permits so that Kansas residents may carry in other states that accept Kansas concealed carry permits.

Kentucky
On February 14, 2019, the Kentucky Senate passed SB150 by a vote of 29–8. It then passed the Kentucky House of Representatives on March 1, 2019, by a vote of 60–37. On March 11, 2019, Governor Matt Bevin signed the bill into law (effective June 27, 2019). It allows residents and non-residents who are 21 years old or older who are otherwise able to lawfully possess a firearm, to carry concealed firearms (or any other weapon) without a permit. Residents and non-residents under 21 may open carry without a permit, or conceal carry if they are a non-resident and hold a valid out-of-state concealed carry permit. Open carry without a permit was already legal for residents and non-residents before passage of the bill and is guaranteed by the State Constitution.

Maine
In 2015, LD 652 was a constitutional carry bill that was under consideration by the Maine Legislature. It was sponsored by Senator Eric Brakey with 17 co-sponsors in the Senate and 79 co-sponsors in the House. LD 652 was signed into law by Governor Paul LePage on July 8, 2015 (effective October 15, 2015), applying to both residents and nonresidents with no permit being required at 18+ for open carry and none required for concealed carry unless under 21.

Mississippi 
In 2013, the Unlicensed Open Carry Bill was passed to clarify that no permit was needed to open carry at the age of 18+ for residents and non-residents, it was clarified by the Mississippi Supreme Court that the Right to Open Carry was guaranteed by the Mississippi State Constitution. As of July 1, 2015, the concealed carry law was amended to say "no license shall be required under this section for a loaded or unloaded pistol or revolver carried in a purse, handbag, satchel, other similar bag or briefcase or fully enclosed case." On April 15, 2016, the law was further expanded to include belt and shoulder holsters and sheaths. This effectively allows for constitutional carry in Mississippi for residents and nonresidents age 18+. However, some forms of concealed carrying would still require a permit (e.g. Mexican carry or concealed in an ankle holster).

Missouri 
SB 656 allows for permitless concealed carry for anyone who may lawfully own a gun. The bill was passed by the legislature in 2016, but Governor Nixon vetoed it on June 27, 2016. The legislature reconvened for the veto-override session on September 14, 2016. The Senate voted to override the veto with a 24–6 vote (23 required) and the House followed through shortly thereafter with a 112–41 vote (109 required). No permit is needed for open carry or concealed carry and applies to both residents and nonresidents. While no permit is required for either form of carrying, only concealed carry falls fully under state-preemption. Therefore, unlicensed open carry can still be restricted by local city ordinances unless one possesses a concealed carry permit, thus exempting them from local open carry restrictions. The law went into effect on January 1, 2017.

Montana 
On February 18, 2021, Montana Governor Greg Gianforte signed HB 102 into law, which allows residents and nonresidents 18 or older to concealed carry a firearm throughout the state without a permit. Open carry without a permit was already legal for residents and non-residents. HB 102 also removed a number of Montana's "gun-free" zones, which previously prohibited carrying a firearm in select locations throughout the state. HB 102 takes effect immediately, save one provision altering the law on carrying a handgun on college and university grounds, which will go into effect June 1, 2021. This law makes Montana the 18th state to allow permitless carry of a firearm for anyone 18+. Previously, permitless concealed carry was allowed if a person was outside the official boundaries of a city or town or the confines of a logging, lumbering, mining, or railroad camp or who is lawfully engaged in hunting, fishing, trapping, camping, hiking, backpacking, farming, ranching, or other outdoor activity in which weapons are often carried for recreation or protection.

Previously, HB 271 was introduced in 2011 to allow constitutional carry. The bill passed the House with a vote of 55–45 and passed the Senate with a vote of 29–21. It was vetoed by then-Governor Brian Schweitzer on May 10, 2011, and was unable to gather the necessary two-thirds majority to overturn the veto. 

HB 298 was introduced in the 2015 legislative session, which would have legalized firearms carry statewide for all persons who are not prohibited from possessing a firearm. The bill passed the House 56-43 and the Senate 28-21 but was later vetoed by Governor Steve Bullock.

New Hampshire
In early 2017, several senators and representatives introduced New Hampshire Senate Bill 12, which proposed removing the requirement for a license to carry a loaded concealed handgun. The bill also proposed extending the minimum license period from four years to five years, removing the discretionary "suitable person" language from the Pistol/Revolver License law, and directing the state police to pursue reciprocity agreements. On January 19, it was passed by the New Hampshire Senate by a vote of 13–10. Governor Chris Sununu, who took office in January 2017, expressed support for this bill after the Senate vote, stating, "I am pleased that the State Senate today voted to advance common-sense legislation in support of a citizen’s fundamental right to carry a firearm, joining neighboring states throughout the region and across the country." On February 9, it was passed by the New Hampshire House by a vote of 200–97. Governor Sununu signed the bill into law on February 22, 2017, and it became effective immediately. Thus, no permit is required for open carry or concealed carry of handguns; and this applies to both residents and nonresidents 18+.

Previously, carrying a concealed handgun unloaded was legal without a license. A New Hampshire Supreme Court decision in 2013 clarified that the law did not prohibit carrying a concealed handgun if it is unloaded (no round is chambered).

North Dakota (residents only; concealed carry only) 
On March 23, 2017, North Dakota Governor Doug Burgum signed House Bill 1169 (effective August 1, 2017). Under its provisions, people carrying concealed without a concealed weapons license will need to carry a form of state-issued photo ID, must be a North Dakota resident for at least 30 days (originally 1 year), must have had a state-issued ID for 1 year, must inform police about their handgun upon contact, and must not otherwise be prohibited from possessing a firearm by law. Minimum age is 18. Open carry of a loaded handgun will still require a permit, but no permit is required to open carry an unloaded handgun; one is allowed to possess a loaded magazine as long as it is not inserted into the gun. Carrying in a vehicle was originally thought of as requiring a permit, but Attorney General Wayne Stenehjem issued an opinion interpreting the law as allowing for constitutional carry within vehicles. This was codified in 2019. Nonresidents are required to have a resident permit recognized by North Dakota to carry openly or concealed.

Ohio 
On March 14, 2022, Ohio Governor Mike DeWine signed Senate Bill 215 (effective June 13, 2022).  Under its provisions, any person 21+ (both residents and nonresidents) who meets the definition of a "qualifying adult" under O.R.C. 2923.111, may carry a concealed handgun, as well as carry a loaded handgun in a motor vehicle openly or concealed without a permit. Residents and non-residents under 21 may still open carry, but require a valid concealed handgun license issued by another U.S. jurisdiction to conceal carry. Open carry without a permit was already legal for residents and non-residents.

Oklahoma 
On February 27, 2019, Oklahoma Governor Kevin Stitt signed House Bill 2597 (effective November 1, 2019), which will allow both residents and non-residents 21+ (or 18+ and in the military) to open or concealed carry without a permit. Oklahoma's existing reciprocity also recognizes any concealed carry license issued both as resident and non-resident as well as the permitless carry of other states, so if one is a non-resident and 18+ and their state allows open carry or concealed carry without a permit, they may carry in that fashion so long as they have valid ID proving they are a resident of that state.

South Dakota
On January 22, 2019, the South Dakota Senate passed SB 47 by a vote of 23–11. It then passed the House of Representatives on January 29, 2019, by a vote of 47–23. Governor Kristi Noem signed SB 47 on January 31, 2019 (effective July 1, 2019). This change in the law removes the requirement of a permit to concealed carry a handgun for residents and nonresidents 18+. Open carry was already legal without a permit for residents and non-residents.

Tennessee (handguns only) 
On March 18, 2021, the Tennessee Senate passed Senate Bill 765, 23–9. On March 29, 2021, the Tennessee House of Representatives passed the bill, 64–29. Governor Bill Lee signed the bill on April 8, 2021. The law, which took effect July 1, 2021, allows for both open and concealed carrying of handguns by any unprohibited person, resident or non-resident, 21 and older without a permit as well as for current and former U.S. military members ages 18 to 20. Non-residents 18 to 20 may carry but are required to possess a recognized permit to carry. It does not apply to long guns, a point of contention among gun rights activists.

Texas
On April 19, 2021, the Texas House approved HB 1927. The Texas Senate approved an amended version on May 5. The House chose to reject the Senate changes and a conference committee was formed. The compromise version was then approved by the House on May 23 and the Senate on May 24. The bill was sent to Texas Governor Greg Abbott on May 28 and he signed it into law on June 16, 2021. The bill took effect on September 1, 2021. The new law allows the carrying of a handgun without a license, openly or concealed, for both residents and non-residents, as long as one is 21 years or older, legally able to possess a handgun, and has not been convicted in the last five years of misdemeanor bodily assault causing injury, deadly conduct, terroristic threat, or disorderly conduct (display or discharge) of a firearm. Open carry requires a holster. Carrying long guns without a license was already legal.

Utah
On February 12, 2021, 2021 Utah Governor Spencer Cox signed HB60 into law (effective May 5, 2021). It took effect May 5, 2021. It allows for permitless carry, both openly and concealed, for adults over the age of 21. Adults in Utah ages 18–20 are allowed to concealed carry with a provisional permit or open carry without a permit if unloaded – two actions away from firing.

Previously, in 2013, HB76 was passed by a two-thirds majority in both the state House and the state Senate, but Governor Gary Herbert subsequently vetoed the bill, stating that the existing gun laws did not restrict one's ability to acquire a concealed carry permit, and "we're not the wild and woolly west." Other attempts had been made to renew the efforts, but had failed because then-Governor Herbert had stated he would veto the effort.

Vermont
For many decades, the only state to allow "constitutional carry" of a handgun (i.e., without any government permit) was Vermont. From the formation of the 13 original states, "constitutional carry" was the law in all states until the 19th century. By the 20th century, all states except Vermont had enacted concealed carry bans, with the exemption in most states for those citizens with a permit. Due to wording in its state constitution and decisions made by the state courts, Vermont has never been able to have a restriction on the method of how one could carry a firearm, and thus, in this regard, Vermont stood entirely separate from the rest of the United States for quite some time. No permit is required (or offered) for open carry and concealed carry, and this applies to both residents and nonresidents 16+ who can legally own a firearm. Because of this, constitutional carry is still sometimes referred to as "Vermont carry".

West Virginia
HB 4145 was passed by the West Virginia House on February 8, 2016, and Senate on February 22, 2016, but vetoed by Governor Earl Ray Tomblin on March 3, 2016. The House then voted to override the veto on March 4, 2016, and the Senate voted to override on March 5, 2016. The law took effect on May 24, 2016. No permit is needed to open carry for residents and nonresidents 18+ and for concealed carry for residents and nonresidents 21+. Residents and nonresidents may carry concealed if between 18 and 21 with a recognized permit.

Wyoming
On March 2, 2011, Wyoming Governor Matt Mead signed legislation to allow constitutional carry for residents of the state, effective July 1, 2011. On April 6, 2021, Governor Mark Gordon signed a bill allowing constitutional carry for residents of other states, effective July 1, 2021. Under the law, United States citizens and lawful permanent residents age 21 or older may carry concealed or openly without a permit. People under 21 must have a valid concealed carry permit from a jurisdiction that Wyoming recognizes if they wish to carry concealed, or can open carry without a permit.

Wyoming is similar to Vermont in that the police may not disarm a citizen just because they "feel" it's necessary.

U.S. states that have a limited form of permitless concealed carry

Certain states may have a limited form of permitless carry, restricted based on one or more of the following: a person's location, the loaded/unloaded state of the firearm, or the specific persons who may carry without a permit. , three of these states are Illinois, New Mexico and Washington.

Illinois (Non-resident, Unloaded and fully enclosed weapon)
In 1996, the Fourth District Illinois Appellate Court ruled that an unloaded handgun carried in a purse did not meet the definition of unlawful use of a weapon per se due to being fully enclosed and possessed in conjunction with a FOID card of an Illinois resident. Following this ruling, a movement started in the early 2000s dubbed Fanny Pack Carry, where proponents carried unloaded handguns in fanny packs to protest the state's outright ban on carrying loaded firearms. This resulted in several arrests, but ultimately every criminal prosecution failed and resulted in one successful wrongful arrest lawsuit.
 
In 2009 the Supreme Court of Illinois ruled that any object that fully encloses a handgun and fastens closed in any form or manner legally constitutes a "case" per se under Illinois Law.
 
Following this in 2011 before the passage of Conceal Carry in Illinois, the Illinois Department of Natural Resources published a brochure which stated that to transport a firearm on one's person, one only has to meet three conditions:
 Unloaded
 Enclosed in a case
 Possessed in conjunction with an Illinois FOID.
 
The Illinois State Police reaffirmed this in a 2012 brochure that states that a person may have a firearm upon their person as long as it's unloaded and enclosed in a case.
 
Non-residents of Illinois are specifically exempted from the requirement to have a FOID Card while carrying an unloaded firearm enclosed in a case.

New Mexico (unloaded weapon)
Under New Mexico law, no permit is needed for open carry for anyone 19+ but a concealed handgun license is required for concealed carry when the weapon is both loaded and concealed, and the individual carrying is on foot. It is legal to carry an unloaded firearm.

Washington (outdoor recreational activities) 
Washington allows for open carry without a permit, and concealed carry without a permit when a person is hiking, hunting, fishing, camping, horseback riding, or performing some other lawful outdoor recreational activity, so long as it is reasonable to assume that they are performing that activity or traveling to or from the activity.

U.S. states with only permitless open carry

Most U.S. states have historically only regulated the concealed carrying of weapons while leaving the open carrying of legal weapons largely unregulated. The states of Colorado, Delaware, Louisiana, Michigan, Nebraska, Nevada, North Carolina, Oregon, Pennsylvania, Virginia, and Wisconsin allow for the unlicensed carrying of handguns openly while still requiring a permit for concealed carry. Since these states do not allow for permitless concealed carry they are not considered full constitutional carry states.

Colorado
Colorado does not regulate the unlicensed open carry of firearms at a state level for those 18+. In 2021, the Colorado General Assembly removed preemption of firearm laws allowing local jurisdictions to regulate the open carrying of firearms. Colorado also considers your vehicle an extension of your home and does not require a permit to conceal carry while inside a private automobile or in some other private means of conveyance.

Delaware
Open carry without a permit is generally permitted in Delaware for those 18+. In 2014, the Delaware Supreme Court made a ruling that recognized open carry as a long standing fundamental right, and could only be prohibited by local ordinances in effect prior to July 4, 1985. The city of Dover formerly required a permit from the police chief for a state concealed permit to open carry, but this was repealed in October 2015 in accordance with the ruling.

Louisiana
Open carry without a permit is generally permitted in Louisiana for those 17+, except in local jurisdictions with ordinances regulating open carry passed before July 15, 1985.

As of August 1st, 2022, constitutional carry is legal for active duty military and veterans only.

Michigan
Open carry of a handgun registered to its owner without a permit is generally permitted in Michigan for Michigan residents 18+. A permit is still required to carry in a vehicle.

Nebraska
Open carry without a permit is generally legal in Nebraska for those 18+, but may be restricted by local governments. A permit is required while open carrying in a vehicle since the Nebraska Supreme Court ruled that a permit is required in order to have a firearm in a vehicle, even if it is in a locked case because it constitutes "carrying a concealed weapon on or about one's person" if it can be accessed from within the vehicle, regardless of where it's located.

Nevada
Open carry without a permit is generally permitted in Nevada for those 18+. For open carry in a vehicle, the firearm may be anywhere except concealed upon the person without a permit.

North Carolina
Open carry without a permit is generally permitted in North Carolina for those 18+. The preemption laws do not fully encompass open carry, and some municipalities have banned it on town property.

Oregon

Open carry without a permit is generally permitted under Oregon state law for 18+. However, Oregon law allows a city or county to regulate open carry of loaded firearms in public places, with holders of concealed carry permits being exempt. (ORS 166.173) The cities of Portland, Beaverton, Tigard, Oregon City, Salem, and Independence, as well as Multnomah County, have statutes that do not allow open carry of loaded firearms (unless one has a concealed carry permit).

Pennsylvania

Open carry is generally legal under Pennsylvania state law for those 18+. However, exceptions are made for Philadelphia as a “City of the First Class”, in a vehicle, or during a declared state of emergency unless one has a carry permit. On May 31, 2019, the Supreme Court of Pennsylvania ruled that carrying a firearm is not reasonable suspicion to detain someone.

Virginia

Open carry is generally allowed in Virginia without a permit for people 18 years of age and older. The following cities and counties have exceptions that disallow the open carry of a loaded semi-automatic center-fire rifle or pistol that expels single or multiple projectiles by the action of an explosion of a combustible material and is equipped at the time of the offense with a magazine that will hold more than 20 rounds of ammunition or designed by the manufacturer to accommodate a silencer or equipped with a folding stock or shotguns equipped with a magazine that holds more than 7 rounds: the Cities of Alexandria, Chesapeake, Fairfax, Falls Church, Newport News, Norfolk, Richmond, and Virginia Beach and in the Counties of Arlington, Fairfax, Henrico, Loudoun, and Prince William. These restrictions do not apply to valid concealed carry permit holders.

Wisconsin
Open carry without a permit is generally permitted in Wisconsin for those 18+. A permit is required while open carrying a loaded handgun in a vehicle since the Wisconsin Supreme Court ruled that carrying a loaded handgun "within reach" constitutes carrying as per the Concealed Carry Act.

Ages to carry without a permit 

* May carry at age 18 if active or honorably discharged member of the U.S. military. 

** Age to carry set at 18 by federal court order.

*** North Dakota only permits permitless concealed carry for residents of the state.

**** Non-residents of Oklahoma from states that allow permitless carry under the age of 21 are allowed to carry without a permit in Oklahoma at the age permitted by their state of residence for permitless carry.

See also
 Concealed carry in the United States
 Gun laws in the United States (federal)
 Gun laws in the United States (by state)
 Open carry in the United States

Notes

References

Licenses
Gun politics in the United States
Self-defense
United States firearms law